As established and defined by the Montana Constitution, the government of the State of Montana is composed of three branches, the Executive, Judicial, and Legislative.  The powers of initiative and referendum are reserved for the citizens of Montana.

The second and current state constitution was enacted in 1972. Among its changes, it stipulated that all Montanans' access to their government is a constitutionally protected right, and it includes the right to examine documents or to observe the deliberations of all public bodies or agencies of state government and its subdivisions.

Legislative Branch 

Like the federal government and 48 other states, Montana has a bicameral legislature composed of two chambers, a 100-member House of Representatives and a 50-member Senate.  Legislators are elected by popular vote.  As of 1992 term limits were enacted limiting House members to four 2-year terms, and Senate members to two 4-year terms.  The Montana State Legislature convenes only on odd-numbered years, and for 90-day periods.  In addition, state law allows for the legislature to be convened in special session by the governor or at the written request of a majority of the members.  As of 2005, the Montana Legislature has been convened in special session thirty times in its history.

Executive branch 
The daily administration of the state’s laws, as defined in the Montana Code Annotated, are carried out by the chief executive—the Governor, and their second in command the Lieutenant Governor, the Secretary Of State, the Attorney General, the Superintendent of Public Instruction, the State Auditor, and by the staff and employees of the 14 executive branch agencies.

Acknowledging the importance of providing for an orderly arrangement in the administrative organization of state government, the number of principal departments from which all executive and administrative offices, boards, bureaus, commissions, agencies and instrumentalities of the executive branch (except for the office of governor, lieutenant governor, secretary of state, attorney general, superintendent of public instruction, and auditor) must perform their respective functions, powers, and duties, is constitutionally limited to not more than 20 principal departments.  Currently the state operates with 14 principal departments.  Provision is made within the state constitution for the establishment of temporary commissions not allocated within a department.

Executive branch agencies

Commissions, Councils, Boards and Offices 

Advisory Council on Aging
Aeronautics Board
Banking Board
Board of Crime Control
Board of Environmental Review
Board of Housing
Board of Investments
Board of Pardons and Parole
Board of Public Assistance
Board of Public Education
Board of Research and Commercialization
Brain Injury Advisory Council
Burial Preservation Board
Capital Finance Advisory Council
Capitol Complex Advisory Council
Child & Family Services Advisory Councils
Children's Special Health Services Advisory Council
Coal Board
Commissioner of Political Practices
Consensus Council
Council on Homelessness
County Printing Board
Disability Advisory Council
Early Childhood Advisory Council
Economic Development Advisory Council
Electronic Government Advisory Council
HIV/AIDS Advisory Council 

Information Technology Board
Interagency Coordinating Council
Land Information Advisory Council
Medicaid Drug Use Review Board
Mental Health Oversight Advisory Council
Montana Arts Council
Montana Heritage Commission
Montana Lottery
Montana State Fund
Office of Public Instruction
Office of the Commissioner of Higher Education
Office of the State Public Defender
Petroleum Board
Provider Rates & Services Commission
Public Employees Retirement System
Public Service Commission
Publishing Policy Committee
Reserved Water Rights Compact Commission
State Tax Appeal Board
State Workforce Innovation Board (SWIB)
Statewide Independent Living Council
Statewide Interoperability Executive Council
Teachers Retirement Board
Tobacco Prevention Advisory Board
Tourism Advisory Council
Transportation Commission
Vocational Rehabilitation Council
Worklife Wellness Advisory Council

Judicial Branch 
The highest court in the state is the Montana Supreme Court. The court hears cases pertaining to the disputes involving Montana State Government, and interprets; state statutes, the State constitution, and administrative rules.  Unlike most state court systems and the federal judiciary, Montana does not have an intermediate appellate court; the State Supreme Court must hear all appeals.  The Montana Supreme Court has other duties, including lawyer discipline and revisions of various rules, such as the Montana Rules of Civil and Appellate Procedure, the Rules of Professional Conduct that apply to Montana lawyers, and the Rules of Lawyer Disciplinary Enforcement that govern lawyer discipline cases. On occasion, the Montana Supreme Court also must determine whether to impose judicial discipline as recommended by the Judicial Standards Commission.  The Montana Water Court adjudicates matters of water rights within the state.

The Judicial power of the State of Montana is vested in the following:

The Supreme Court, consisting of a Chief Justice and six Associate Justices
The District Courts
The Workers' Compensation Court
The Water Court
The Courts of Limited Jurisdiction, which include Justice Courts, Municipal Courts, and City Courts.

See also
 Montana Senate
 Montana State Legislature
 Montana State Capitol
 Montana Constitution

References

External links
Montana Code Annotated (MCA) 

Montana State Legislature 

State of Montana, Agency Listings 

Montana State Government